Alan E. Burland (born 6 September 1952) is a Bermudian sailor. He participated at the 1984 Summer Olympics in Los Angeles, where he placed fifth in the multihull class Tornado event, together with Christopher Nash.

References

External links 
 

1952 births
Living people
Bermudian male sailors (sport)
Olympic sailors of Bermuda
Sailors at the 1984 Summer Olympics – Tornado